Rómulo Gallegos Municipality may refer to the following places in the Venezuela:

Rómulo Gallegos Municipality, Apure
Rómulo Gallegos Municipality, Cojedes

Municipality name disambiguation pages